The Holman Field Administration Building is a Kasota limestone building designed by Clarence Wigington and built in 1939 by WPA employees. It serves as the control building for the St. Paul Downtown Airport in Saint Paul in the U.S. state of Minnesota. The airport was named for Charles W. Holman, who won the U.S. air speed trials in 1930.  The airfield was built on the former site of Lamprey Lake, which was filled with dredged material from the adjacent Mississippi River, which regularly floods the airport. Across the river in Indian Mounds Park is one of the last remaining airway beacons in the country.

During World War II, Northwest Airlines employed up to 5000 people at the site, modifying new B-24 Liberator bombers, some of which received the highly classified H2X radar, which proved to be an invaluable tool in the European theater.

A restaurant in the building is open to the general public, and allows viewing of the airfield.

References

External links

Air transportation buildings and structures on the National Register of Historic Places
Buildings and structures completed in 1939
Clarence W. Wigington buildings
Moderne architecture in Minnesota
National Register of Historic Places in Saint Paul, Minnesota
Works Progress Administration in Minnesota